The Michael Rutter Centre for Children and Adolescents is based at the Maudsley Hospital, a psychiatric hospital run by the National Health Service NHS. Named after Sir Michael Rutter, it caters for children suffering from mental health issues such as anorexia. In 1994 it was estimated that at least 10% of children suffering from mental health problems required specialist facilities, but only 1-1.5% of children were being referred. (Garralda, M.E. 1994). Parry-Jones described Child Mental Health Services as the 'Cinderella Service' (Parry-Jones, W. 1992).

See also
 Healthcare in London

References

External links
 Contribution to research and development
 South London and Maudsley NHS Foundation Trust
 Middlesex University's mental health history timeline
 Institute of Psychiatry, King's College London

Psychiatric hospitals in England
NHS hospitals in London
Health in the London Borough of Croydon
Health in the London Borough of Lewisham
Health in the London Borough of Lambeth
Health in the London Borough of Southwark
King's College London
Buildings and structures in the London Borough of Southwark